The 1836 United States presidential election in Alabama took place between November 3 and December 7, 1836, as part of the 1836 presidential election. Voters chose seven representatives, or electors, to the Electoral College, who voted for President and Vice President.

Alabama voted for the Democratic candidate, Martin Van Buren, over Whig candidate Hugh White. Van Buren won Alabama by a margin of 10.68%.

Results

See also
United States presidential elections in Alabama

References

Alabama
1836
1836 Alabama elections